Drillia bruuni is a species of sea snail, a marine gastropod mollusk in the family Drilliidae.

Distribution
This species occurs in the demersal zone of the Atlantic Ocean off West Africa at a depth of 27–29 m.

References

  Tucker, J.K. 2004 Catalog of recent and fossil turrids (Mollusca: Gastropoda). Zootaxa 682:1-1295

bruuni
Gastropods described in 1952